Bonnie Koloc (born February 6, 1946) is an American folk music singer-songwriter, actress and artist. She was considered one of the three main Illinois-based folk singers in the 1970s, along with Steve Goodman and John Prine forming the "trinity of the Chicago folk scene". Her music continues to be recognized and valued by historians of Chicago folk music as well as by her long standing fan base in that area. But her voice, which may be considered crystalline in its clarity, is remembered as well.

Life and career
Koloc was born in Waterloo, Iowa, to a working-class family. She told The Chicago Tribune, "I guess you could say we were poor; we lived in a cement block house outside the city limits of Waterloo, Iowa, and my dad worked in the John Deere factory. Money was very tight. I wore a lot of hand-me-downs, and I thought that people who had indoor johns must be rich. I had a really unstable childhood, because my parents were divorced when I was 12, and there was a lot of chaos. I spent a lot of time during my high school years trying to get myself together from my childhood."

The first of her family to attend college, she enrolled in the University of Northern Iowa, first majoring in drama, then art, paying her way by singing, but becoming increasingly dissatisfied with university life. She abandoned her studies to go to Chicago, where she became a fixture of the influential Earl of Old Town.

She had a minor hit with "Roll Me On the Water" from the 1974 album You're Gonna Love Yourself in the Morning, but never achieved the national recognition that many predicted for her. She has, however, maintained her iconic status in the Chicago area where she is considered, along with Steve Goodman and John Prine, to have been a quintessential influence in the development of Chicago folk music during the 1970s and later. Reviewing the 1977 album Close-Up in Christgau's Record Guide: Rock Albums of the Seventies (1981), Robert Christgau wrote, "This is where Koloc's modest, unmistakable intelligence—and voice—finally make a record work."

In the 1980s, after the death of her long-time companion, she pursued a career as an actress, and performed in plays such as Joseph Papp's Broadway production of The Human Comedy, but by the late 1980s, she focused on her art studies. Currently living in Iowa with her husband, the author Robert Wolf, Koloc has taught at the University of Iowa, launched several art shows, and continued to hone her beautiful and unique singing voice. Since 2000, she has resumed her musical career and continues to perform concerts in the Chicago area.

Discography
After All This Time, Ovation, 1971
Hold On to Me, Ovation Records, 1972
Bonnie Koloc, Ovation Records, 1973
You're Gonna Love Yourself in the Morning, Ovation Records, 1974
At Her Best, Ovation Records, 1976
Close-Up, Epic Records, 1976
Wild and Recluse, Epic Records, 1978
The Human Comedy (original Broadway cast recording on 2 CDs) Kilmarnock Records KIL 9702, 1984
With You on my Side, Flying Fish, 1987
Visual Voice, Naim Audio, 2000
Timeless, self-released, 2004 (disc 1, recordings from 1973 to 1979; disc 2, recordings from 1979 to 1990)
A Bestiary – Beasts of the Farm, self-released art book and CD, 2004
Here to Sing, self-released, 2006
Beginnings, self-released, 2010 (1969 recordings from the Earl Of Old Town and the University of Illinois)
Rediscovered, self-released 2012 (selected songs from early albums newly recorded with new arrangements)
Seems Like Yesterday, self-released 2017 (16 songs, most recorded live at Amazingrace in 1970s)

References

External links
Official Website

Old Town School of Folk musicians
Living people
Writers from Waterloo, Iowa
1946 births
Ovation Records artists
Flying Fish Records artists
Epic Records artists